Radio Kärnten is the regional radio for Carinthia and is part of the Österreich 2 group.
It is broadcast by the ORF, and the programs from Radio Kärnten are made in the ORF Kärnten Studio.
The music programme is made of oldies music and "Austropop".

External links 
 

Radio stations in Austria
Radio stations established in 1967
1967 establishments in Austria
ORF (broadcaster)